The Women's 200 metre individual medley competition of the 2022 European Aquatics Championships will be held on 15 and 16 August 2022.

Records
Prior to the competition, the existing world, European and championship records were as follows.

Results

Heats
The heats were started on 15 August at 09:49.

Semifinals
The semifinals were started at 19:07.

Final
The final was held on 16 August at 18:17.

References

Women's 200 metre individual medley